The Colectivo 60 (the number 60 bus route) commenced operations in 1931 and runs from Constitución station, in the centre of the city of Buenos Aires, Argentina to the Tigre Club in the partido of Tigre.  The service is operated by Nudo S.A., Azul S.A.T.A. and M.O.T.S.A. and the identifying colour of the buses is yellow, with red and black details.

Known locally as El Sesenta ("The Sixty"), the service is sometimes dubbed El Internacional (The International) because it passes through (or close to) many landmarks of the city and of the northern suburbs, including:

 Boca Juniors Stadium
 Constitución railway station
 Avenida de Mayo
 Liceo Theater
 Argentine National Congress
 Confitería El Molino tea room and the Savoy hotel and ballroom
 Callao y Corrientes commercial district
 Palace of Justice ("Tribunales")
 Obras Sanitarias building, Córdoba y Ayacucho
 University of Buenos Aires complex:
 Faculty of Medicine
 Faculty of Dentistry
 Faculty of Economic Sciences
 Faculty of Pharmacy and Biochemistry
 Faculty of Social Sciences (Marcelo T. de Alvear branch)
 Faculty of Engineering (Las Heras branch)
 Hospital de Clínicas "José de San Martín"
 Embassy of Uruguay
 La Recoleta Cemetery
 Recoleta entertainment district
 Automóvil Club Argentino
 Plaza Las Heras
 Rivadavia Hospital
 Fernández Hospital
 Buenos Aires Zoo in Palermo
 Buenos Aires Botanical Garden in Palermo
 SRA exhibition grounds
 Plaza Italia
 United States embassy
 Pacífico train station
 Hipódromo Argentino
 Military hospital
 Barrancas de Belgrano park and transportation hub
 Barrio Chino
 River Plate Stadium
 Cabildo y Juramento (Belgrano high street)
 Cabildo y Congreso (terminal of the subte D line)
 Saavedra bridge
 Olivos city centre
 C.A. Platense Stadium
 San Isidro hospital (San Isidro Partido)
 San Isidro racetrack
 San Isidro cathedral (San Isidro cathedral)
 Tigre stadium (Tigre Partido)
 Tigre fruit market
 Tigre tourism centre (gateway to the Paraná Delta).

One branch of the service reaches Tigre via the Pan-American Highway.

See also
Transportation in Argentina
Colectivo

Notes and references

External links
Information and Route in GoogleMaps of Bus 60

Transport in Buenos Aires
Bus routes in Buenos Aires